The Rocky Mountain Journal of Mathematics is a peer-reviewed mathematics journal published by the Rocky Mountain Mathematics Consortium.
Founded in 1971, the journal publishes both research and expository articles on mathematics, with an emphasis on survey articles. 
The journal is indexed by Mathematical Reviews and Zentralblatt MATH.
Its 2009 MCQ was 0.25. According to the Journal Citation Reports, the journal has a 2016 impact factor of 0.250.

References

External links
 

Mathematics journals
Publications established in 1971
English-language journals
Bimonthly journals
Academic journals published by learned and professional societies